The Lugano–Tesserete railway (LT) was a Swiss metre gauge railway that linked the towns of Lugano and Tesserete, in the canton of Ticino.

At Lugano station, a link track connected to the adjacent Lugano–Ponte Tresa railway, allowing transfer of rolling stock.

The line was opened in 1909 and closed in 1967. It was replaced by a bus service, which subsequently merged with that of the Lugano–Cadro–Dino railway, and today operates as the Autolinee Regionali Luganesi (ARL).

The first  of the line was in the street, but much of the rest of the line was on its own right of way, with tunnels, bridges and viaducts. Many of these still exist, and it is possible to trace the route of the line. The station at Tesserete still exists, and is used as a depot by the ARL. The station at Lugano has been demolished, and the site is now occupied by a bus stop and turning circle.

References

External links 
 

Closed railway lines in Switzerland
Metre gauge railways in Switzerland
Railway companies of Switzerland
Transport in Lugano
Transport in Ticino